The Ballpark at Jackson is a 6,000-seat minor league baseball stadium in Jackson, Tennessee, United States. It opened in 1998.

The Ballpark at Jackson was built by the municipal government of Jackson, Tennessee, and was the home of the Jackson Generals, formerly of the Southern League from 1998 to 2020. The stadium is northeast of downtown Jackson and is visible from Interstate 40.

It also hosts other events, including Pro Wrestling for the USA Championship Wrestling company.

History

In conjunction with Major League Baseball's reorganization of the minor leagues after the 2020 season, the Jackson Generals were not invited to serve as any team's affiliate, effectively ending their run in the Southern League and affiliated baseball altogether. The future of the team is uncertain. While, Major League Baseball has stated its intentions to assist cities like Jackson in joining independent baseball leagues, the team's lease requires them to maintain a Class A, Double-A, or Triple-A affiliation to remain at The Ballpark at Jackson.

With no team lined up for 2021, the Generals agreed to operate The Ballpark at Jackson as a temporary home for the Winnipeg Goldeyes, an independent American Association team based in Winnipeg, Manitoba, Canada, which was displaced due to COVID-19 travel restrictions. However, Jackson Mayor Scott Conger notified the teams that the Generals lost their authority to manage the city-owned ballpark when they lost their affiliation with Minor League Baseball and that they were issued an eviction notice to leave the stadium after May 30, nine days after the Goldeyes' May 21 home opener. On June 1, the Goldeyes entered into a new license agreement with the city to continue use of the facility. The Generals and the City of Jackson went go to an arbiter to determine which party had legal control of the stadium. The arbiter ruled in favor of the city, determining the team's lease to be invalid after the loss of its affiliation and requiring the team to vacate the ballpark.

Naming rights
From its opening until November 1, 2012, The Ballpark at Jackson was known as Pringles Park, due to a naming rights agreement with Procter & Gamble, then-owners of the Pringles brand, which has a factory in Jackson. In 2012, the Pringles brand was sold to Kellogg Company. Kellogg's opted not to renew the naming rights agreement, and the name was changed to The Ballpark at Jackson for the 2013 season.

Notable events
The Ballpark at Jackson has hosted the 1999 and 2011 Southern League All-Star Games and the 2010, 2011, 2012, and 2021 Ohio Valley Conference baseball tournament.

References

External links
 Jackson Generals: Ballpark Info
 City of Jackson: The Ballpark at Jackson
 Pringles Park Views - Ball Parks of the Minor Leagues

Minor league baseball venues
Baseball venues in Tennessee
Buildings and structures in Madison County, Tennessee
Sports in Jackson, Tennessee
1998 establishments in Tennessee
Sports venues completed in 1998